Milad Rakhshan (born September 30, 1986) is an Iranian footballer who plays for Sanat Naft Abadan F.C. in the IPL.

Club career
In 2010, Rakhshan joined Sanat Naft Abadan F.C. after spending the previous season at Shensa in the Azadegan League.

Assists

References

1986 births
Living people
Shensa players
Sanat Naft Abadan F.C. players
Iranian footballers
Association football midfielders
People from Arak, Iran